The men's middleweight (−87 kilograms) event at the 2010 Asian Games took place on 17 November 2010 at Guangdong Gymnasium, Guangzhou, China.

A total of eleven competitors from eleven different countries competed in this event, limited to fighters whose body weight was less than 87 kilograms. 

The defending champion Yousef Karami of Iran won the gold medal after beating Park Yong-hyun of South Korea in gold medal match 4–3, He beat athletes from Bahrain and China before reaching the final. The bronze medal was shared by Yin Zhimeng of China and Nguyễn Trọng Cường from Vietnam.

Athletes from Jordan, Bahrain, Indonesia and Lebanon shared the fifth place.

Schedule
All times are China Standard Time (UTC+08:00)

Results

References

Results

External links
Official website

Taekwondo at the 2010 Asian Games